Coldwater is a village in Mercer County, Ohio, United States. The population was 4,427 at the 2010 census.

History
Coldwater was founded in 1838  and was originally called Buzzard's Glory for by David Buzzard who operated a general store.  Coldwater was platted in 1859. The village takes its name from nearby Coldwater Creek. A post office has been in operation at Coldwater since 1847.

Geography
Coldwater is located at  (40.480402, -84.629332).

Demographics

As of 2000 the median income for a household in the village was $63,382, and the median income for a family was $81,076. Males had a median income of $47,055 versus $42,401 for females. The per capita income for the village was $29,583. About 2.2% of families and 3.4% of the population were below the poverty line, including 1.2% of those under age 18 and 4.2% of those age 65 or over.

2010 census
As of the census of 2010, there were 4,427 people, 1,726 households, and 1,176 families residing in the village. The racial makeup of the village was 99.0% White, 0.1% African American, 0.1% Asian, 0.3% Pacific Islander, 0.2% from other races, and 0.3% from two or more races. Hispanic or Latino of any race were 0.7% of the population.

There were 1,726 households, of which 32.7% had children under the age of 18 living with them, 58.1% were married couples living together, 6.5% had a female householder with no husband present, 3.5% had a male householder with no wife present, and 31.9% were non-families. 29.1% of all households were made up of individuals, and 15.2% had someone living alone who was 65 years of age or older. The average household size was 2.49 and the average family size was 3.10.

The median age in the village was 39.2 years. 26.2% of residents were under the age of 18; 7.9% were between the ages of 18 and 24; 22.9% were from 25 to 44; 25.9% were from 45 to 64; and 17.1% were 65 years of age or older. The gender makeup of the village was 47.9% male and 52.1% female.

Education
It is home to Coldwater High School, Coldwater Middle School, and Coldwater Elementary School, public schools that are part of the Coldwater Exempted Village School District.

Library
It is home to the Coldwater Public Library, which is largely funded by the proceeds from the annual Coldwater Community Picnic.

Culture

Media use
Coldwater was the setting for the 2012 film Touchback; however, the events portrayed in the film are not related to the town.

The 2010 short film “The Haunting in the Mansion on Main” directed by Jeremy Francis takes place in Coldwater.

Coldwater Community Picnic
Annually, on the first weekend of August, a small festival is held at Memorial Park, usually consisting of food, drinks, carnival rides, concerts, games, a parade, and sporting events.  Festivities are kicked off by "sidewalk sales" and Friday night fireworks at the town's shopping center.  Proceeds from the festival are used to improve the park and library.

Food
There are several restaurants in town, most of which specialize in either burgers or pizza.  Many of the restaurants also operate as bars late at night.  An area culinary specialty is tenderloins, a tenderized and breaded pork loin similar to schnitzel, served on a sandwich.

Entertainment
Attending sporting events, particularly high school games, is a popular form of entertainment.  Many community members will attend high school sports on a regular basis.

Religion
Holy Trinity Catholic Church is the largest religious institution.  Coldwater is also home to Coldwater United Methodist Church.

Notable people
Douglas Laux, New York Times Bestselling Author; CIA Case Officer
Keith Wenning, quarterback for the Buffalo Bills
Keven Stammen, professional poker player, winner of 2014 World Poker Tour
Ross Homan, former linebacker for the Ohio State Buckeyes
Jesse E. Moorland, abolitionist and theology professor at Howard University
Cory Luebke, former pitcher for the San Diego Padres.

 James Grover McDonald, First U.S. Ambassador to Israel, Humanitarian

References

External links
 Official website
 Library

Villages in Ohio
Villages in Mercer County, Ohio